Shropham is a civil parish in the English county of Norfolk.
For the purposes of local government, it falls within the district of Breckland.

Its main attraction is the Grade I listed Church of St Peter and St Paul, built in flint in the Perpendicular style. Shropham Hall is an early Georgian country house; it was completed by 1729 for John Barker, later High Sheriff of Norfolk.

The village is listed in the Domesday Book under the name Scerpham.

Historically the hundred of Shropham included many further parishes.

Notable residents 
 Sir Edward Grogan, 2nd Baronet
 Mary E. Mann (1848–1929), writer, lived in the village.
 Justin Fashanu (1961–1998) and John Fashanu (1962-), footballers, used to live in the village

Notes 

 

Villages in Norfolk
Civil parishes in Norfolk
Breckland District